Yawpami is a village in Leshi Township in the Naga Self-Administered Zone in Sagaing Region of northwestern Burma. It lies 15 km to the northeast of Amimi and about 30 km southwest of Salem.

References

External links
"Yawpami Map — Satellite Images of Yawpami" Maplandia World Gazetteer

Populated places in Naga Self-Administered Zone